Embraced by Fire is the fifth album of the German Viking / pagan metal band Wolfchant. It was released on May 1, 2013, in digipak format through NoiseArt Records and contains both new material and a re-recorded version of their first album Bloody Tales of Disgraced Lands.

Track listing

Personnel 
 Lokhi — vocals
 Nortwin - clean vocals
 Ragnar - guitar
 Skaahl - guitar
 Sarolv — bass
 Gvern — keyboard
 Norgahd — drums
 André hofmann — Choir

References

2013 albums
Wolfchant albums